Minuscule 2: Mandibles from Far Away (released in the UK as A Minuscule Adventure) is a 2018 French adventure comedy live action CGI animated film based on the TV show Minuscule and a sequel to Minuscule: Valley of the Lost Ants and was released on January 30, 2019.

Plot 
Years after the events of the first film, Cox the ladybug now lives a happy life with his family in a valley in south-eastern France and are harvesting assorted fruits to sustain them through the winter. One day, Junior, one of Cox's kids, who yearns for independence, parts from the group & tries to haul an apple he finds to their tree home, but it's stolen by Toofete the fly and his gang, who survived due to their ability to come back from the afterlife. Cox then leads them on an open chase that ends up with the flies trapped on a spider's frozen web, which falls down and crashes, killing both spider and flies. Cox and Junior then return home and hibernate for the winter with the others. Later that night, in a small village, Cox's old friend Mandible and his patrol of black ants raid a grocery store to obtain food for the winter, but are attacked by the colony of red ants led by their old archenemy Butor, who seeks revenge against Cox and Mandible. Overwhelmed & separated from the others after a chase into the shipping factory, Mandible uses his antennae to send a long-distance backup call to Cox, who stops hibernating, receives the message and sets off, followed by his son, who wakes up after his father leaves.

When Cox and Junior arrive, war commences, resulting in the red ants falling off a lamp after Cox and Junior swing it in a tug-of-war for Mandible, and ending up trapped in one of boxes of chestnuts that are bound for different locations around the globe, along with Junior, who is hit by the lamp and crash lands into a box that's destined for Guadeloupe in the Caribbean. Cox leaves Mandible & hitches a ride on the truck and then on an airplane headed to Guadalupe at the airport that contains the box Junior is stuck in. After a long journey, they arrive on Guadalupe on a cargo plane and are loaded onto a pickup truck to a bar, where Cox is separated from Junior after the truck hits a speed bump. While Junior is set free and gets lost in the jungle, Cox regains consciousness on the beach and contacts Mandible with the help of a troop of Caribbean ants loading a heavy coconut by spreading the message all the way to France, before setting off to track down Junior. After receiving the message and learning of Cox and Junior's location, Mandible goes to the sewage pipe, where he reaches out to Cox's other friend, the tiny black spider. After some convincing by Mandible, he decides to help and they both modify a model ship by replacing the sails with balloons, and adding electric motors at the back, and set off for Guadalupe, but while crossing the Atlantic Ocean, they get lost in a storm where its lightning strike and electricute the ship, popping all the balloons, causing them to fall into the sea and end up in the belly of a shark, which causes them to go off course as the shark moves around the ocean.

Meanwhile, Junior explores the new environment, where he comes across all sorts of new animals and plants, whereas an open chase from a hungry praying mantis ends up in him falling into a cave and ending up stuck in a jumping spider's web, along with a fly, a black swallowtail caterpillar, and a black ladybug named Coco whom he develops a crush on. Cox arrives and saves them all by dropping a rock on the spider, but as the spider dangles midair, the web unravels causing everyone stuck on the web to fall to the bottom of the cave. Cox and Coco then nearly escape from the spider with the others while carrying a knocked-out Junior who's in a state of coma, and reach the safety of the beach. As the fly and the caterpillar leave for home, Coco takes Cox to her colony's home in a palm tree near the beach where they settle down, and the black ladybugs do a special ritual to help Junior regain consciousness while Cox keeps trying to reach out to his friends with the Caribbean ants, but get no response, due to them not knowing what had recently happened to Mandible and the tiny black spider. Two days later, Junior eventually regains consciousness and he and Cox reunite. They both decide to stay until their friends arrive and during then, Junior begins to bond with Coco as his girlfriend.

One day, a group of construction workers arrive at the black ladybug's home and chop it down with a chainsaw, planning to build a resort on their estate ground. Thinking of a plan to save them, Cox remembers seeing one of the black swallowtail caterpillars after he regained consciousness on the beach and their defense by creating a viciously strong smell that gives humans green pimples and causing them to panic and wash down the smell, which is why the people on the island had considered them a dangerous nuisance. Cox then leaves Junior and Coco to find the caterpillar's home in a banyan tree at the center of the jungle, but they follow him anyway and save him from the praying mantis and his gang, but are eventually cornered near a cliff. Just before they're about to be almost eaten, the ladybugs are suddenly saved by Mandible and the tiny black spider, who escaped from the shark's belly by blasting loud music from the spider's iPod and speakers that they bought, forcing it to spit them out, then used replacement balloons to get back into the air and on course. Cox, Junior, & Coco make a quick escape from the mantises using a firework and head for the caterpillar's banyan tree. Once there, the caterpillar that Cox saved from the jumping spider's cave guides him to their gigantic, very old, and wise leader, who learns of the construction site that's threatening the black ladybugs by using his antennae to look into Cox's memories and he decides to help him. He then arrives with the entire army and eventually manage to ward them away to a new construction site, resulting in the place declared as a caterpillar infested area by scientists.

With the Caribbean ladybug's home saved, the gang then bid farewell to their new friends and leave for home while Mandible trades the coconut with the Caribbean ants to put in his food storage, but Junior decides to stay behind as he doesn't want to leave Coco. He then says goodbye to his father as he gains independence & returns to the island and reunites with Coco while Cox & his friends arrive home and they all return to their homes to resume hibernation. In a mid-credits scene, the chestnut box Butor and his colony were stuck in is shown to have landed in a restaurant in Beijing, China, and as they are set free, Butor begins to plot their escape and their second revenge against Cox and Mandible.

Cast
Unlike the first film, where only a couple of humans appeared, this one shows many more human characters, although their place is very secondary to the insects. A few sentences in French, Creole and Mandarin are spoken, although the words are generally not very understandable.

 Thierry Frémont as the grocer
 Bruno Salomone as the man who chews gum
 Stéphane Coulon as the driver of the van
 Franck Benezech as the construction manager of the hotel
 Sarah Cohen-Hadria as mother
 Bô Gaultier de Kermoal as the radio operator of the submarine

Production 
Part of the filming took place in Guadeloupe, more precisely in the Saintes islands, between June and July 2017.

Critical response
The film received positive reviews from film critics.

References

External links

2010s French animated films
French animated films
2019 computer-animated films
Animated films about insects
Films with live action and animation
2019 films
Films set in Guadeloupe
Films set in France
Films set in Beijing
Films shot in Beijing
French films about revenge
Films shot in Guadeloupe